Benjamin Sorba William Thomas (born 25 January 1999) is a professional footballer who plays as a winger for Blackburn Rovers on loan from Huddersfield Town and the Wales national team.

Club career

Boreham Wood
A youth product of West Ham United, Thomas joined the youth academy of Boreham Wood at the age of 16. He began his senior career at Boreham Wood aged 17. He was an instrumental part of the under-18 side that reached the FA Youth Cup second round in 2016–17, which included a win over English Football League side Northampton Town. In January 2018, he spent a month on loan at Isthmian League North side Cheshunt.

Huddersfield Town
On 13 January 2021, Thomas signed a contract with Huddersfield Town until the end of 2023–24 season with the club having the option of a further year's extension. He made his professional debut for Huddersfield in a 3–2 EFL Championship loss to Wycombe Wanderers on 13 February 2021.

In the first Championship game of the 2021–22 season, a 1–1 draw with Derby County on 7 August 2021, Thomas got his first assist, supplying a cross from a free kick which was headed in by Naby Sarr.  In the following game, a 5–1 home defeat to Fulham, he overhit a backpass which ultimately resulted in Fulham's opening goal, but later provided the assist for Huddersfield's only goal from a corner kick, Matty Pearson scoring with a header.

On 28 August 2021, he scored his first goal (as well as providing two assists) in a 4–0 home victory against Reading: he took possession of the ball at the halfway line, dribbled into the penalty area and placed a low shot past the goalkeeper.

On 10 September 2021, Thomas was awarded EFL Championship Player of the Month for August 2021. On 19 May 2022, one week before the 2022 EFL Championship play-off Final, Thomas signed a new long-term contract with the club until 2026.

On 25 January 2023, he joined fellow EFL Championship side Blackburn Rovers on loan for the remainder of the 2022–23 season.

International career
In March 2020, Thomas was called up to the England C team for the first time for a fixture against Wales C team however this match was postponed due to the COVID-19 pandemic.

On 28 September 2021, Thomas was called up into the senior Wales squad for the first time for their 2022 World Cup qualifiers against Czech Republic and Estonia. He made his international debut for Wales on 8 October 2021 as a second half substitute in the 2–2 draw against Czech Republic, and completed his first full 90 minutes three days later in the match against Estonia. In November 2022 he was named in the Wales squad for the 2022 FIFA World Cup in Qatar.

Personal life
Born in England, Thomas was born to a Sierra Leonean father and Welsh mother. He qualifies for Wales through his mother who was born in Newport.

Career statistics

Club

International

Honours
Individual
EFL Championship Player of the Month: August 2021

See also
List of Wales international footballers born outside Wales

References

External links
 

1999 births
Living people
Footballers from the London Borough of Newham
Welsh footballers
Wales international footballers
Welsh people of Sierra Leonean descent
British sportspeople of Sierra Leonean descent
Sierra Leone Creole people
English sportspeople of Sierra Leonean descent
English people of Welsh descent
Boreham Wood F.C. players
Cheshunt F.C. players
Huddersfield Town A.F.C. players
Blackburn Rovers F.C. players
English Football League players
National League (English football) players
Isthmian League players
2022 FIFA World Cup players
Association football wingers